Gravity Zero may refer to:

"Gravity Zero", a 1957 episode of Science Fiction Theatre
"Gravity Zero", a 2001 single by Two-Mix
Gravity 0 (stylized: GRAVITY Ø), a 2010 album by Aqua Timez
"Gravity 0", a 2010 song by Aqua Timez
"Gravity Zero", a 2014 single by Paolo Pasko

See also

"Gravity Zero Gravity", a 2007 song by Shonen Knife off the album Fun! Fun! Fun!
 microgravity
 weightlessness
 Zero Gravity (disambiguation)
 Zero-G (disambiguation)
 G0 (disambiguation)
 Go (disambiguation)
 o (disambiguation)
 0 (disambiguation)
 Zero (disambiguation)
 Gravity (disambiguation)